SIMPLE (Superheated Instrument for Massive ParticLe Experiments) is an experiment search for direct evidence of dark matter. It is located in a 61 m3 cavern at the 500 level of the Laboratoire Souterrain à Bas Bruit (LSBB) near Apt in southern France. The experiment is predominantly sensitive to spin-dependent interactions of weakly interacting massive particles (or WIMPs).

SIMPLE is an international collaboration with members from Portugal, France, and the United States.

Design
The SIMPLE detector is based on superheated droplet detectors (SDDs), a suspension of 1–2% superheated liquid C2ClF5 droplets (~30 μm radius) in a viscoelastic 900 ml gel matrix, which undergo transitions to the gas phase upon energy deposition by incident radiation. The refrigerant, freon, is used as the active mass.

In effect, each droplet behaves as a miniature bubble chamber. Once a nucleation has occurred, the acoustic shock wave is picked up by microphones. Each acquired signal is then fully discriminated in terms of acoustic external noise, gel-associated noise and most recently particle discrimination. The detectors are typically operated at ~200 kPa and ~280 K. Due to the construction technique, SSDs are almost insensitive to background radiation, and their sensitivity can be adjusted by controlling the temperature and pressure of each device.

Results 
The final phase II analysis was published in Physical Review Letters in 2012.  Spin-dependeant cross section limits were set for light WIMPs.

References

 The SIMPLE Phase II dark matter search (2014)
 Fabrication and response of high concentration SIMPLE superheated droplet detectors with different liquids (2013)
 Final Analysis and Results of the Phase II SIMPLE Dark Matter Search (2012)
 Reply to Comment on First Results of the Phase II SIMPLE Dark Matter Search (2012)
 Comment on First Results of the Phase II SIMPLE Dark Matter Search (2012)
 First Results of the Phase II SIMPLE Dark Matter Search (2010)
 SIMPLE dark matter search results (2005)

External links
 SIMPLE experiment website

Experiments for dark matter search